Gustavus Richard Glenn (December 5, 1848 – January 23, 1939) was the sixth President of the University of North Georgia.

Early life 
Gustavus R. Glenn was born in Jefferson County, Georgia, on December 5, 1848, to James Russell and Anne Williams Glenn. His maternal grandmother was a first cousin to President Zachary Taylor.

Service in education 
The first professional position held by Glenn on a collegiate level was as president of Columbus Female College, which he began in 1875. He remained in this position until a fire destroyed much of the college's campus in 1884. In the same year, Glenn became a professor of physics at Wesleyan College in Macon, Georgia. He served at Wesleyan College until 1893, at which point he became the State School Commissioner.

In the summer of 1904, Glen was elected president of North Georgia Agricultural College.

References 

Heads of universities and colleges in the United States
1848 births
1939 deaths